Jonathan Reed Winkler (born 1975) is a historian and a professor of history at Wright State University in Dayton, Ohio.  He teaches and researches on U.S. foreign relations, U.S. military and naval history, international history, security studies and strategic thought.  He is the author of Nexus: Strategic Communications and American Security in World War I (Harvard University Press, 2008), winner of several prizes including the Birdsall Prize of the American Historical Association. His articles, commentaries and reviews have appeared in Diplomatic History, The Journal of Military History, the Naval War College Review, and other venues.

References

American military writers
American naval historians
American male non-fiction writers
Cold War historians
American military historians
Wright State University faculty
University of Maryland, College Park faculty
United States Naval Academy faculty
Living people
1975 births